The 2013–14 season was Blackburn Rovers' 126th season as a professional football club and its second playing in the Football League Championship since the club's relegation during the 2011–12 Barclays Premier League season.

Caretaker manager for the final few games of the previous season, Gary Bowyer, was given the job permanently.

Grzegorz Sandomierski, Cameron Stewart, David Bentley, David Jones, Todd Kane and Colin Kazim-Richards, all of which were on loan at Rovers during the 12–13 season did not secure permanent contracts, though Todd Kane returned to Rovers for a third loan spell. Mauro Formica and Diogo Rosado, who were both loaned out for the final half of the 12–13 season left the club during the summer transfer window, the former being sold and the latter having his contract terminated. Rubén Rochina and Bruno Ribeiro who were also loaned out towards the end of the 12–13 season returned to the club.

David Dunn's talks over a new contract resulted in a one-year contract extension. Grant Hanley and Lee Williamson also gained contract extensions.

The club tried to move on higher earning players to lighten the wage-bill in preparation for the new rules which were to be introduced in the 2014–15 season.

Pre season
On 24 May 2013, Rovers owners Venkys rewarded Gary Bowyer's performance as 'Caretaker manager' with a 12-month contract as the club's manager.

Bowyer wasted no time in adding to his team making a triple Free transfer signing of midfielder Chris Taylor (Millwall), midfielder Alan Judge (Notts County) and goalkeeper Simon Eastwood (Portsmouth), all of whom are joining the club after their contracts ran out with their clubs. He further indictated that funds had been made available to him by the club's owners, and he would be making changes both incoming and outgoing before the start of the new season.

On 4 June 2013, it was announced that the club had decided to release Micah Evans, Osayamen Osawe, Christopher Dilo, Jamie Maclaren, Reece Hands, Peter Wylie, Ryan Humphreys and Danny Laverty at the ends of their contracts (30 June 2013).

The club also confirmed that young players John O'Sullivan, Raheem Hanley, Hugo Fernandez, Will Beesley, Curtis Haley, Kellen Daly and Darragh Lenihan had all been offered new deals. All were due to be out of contract on 30 June 2013. Young goalkeeper Matthew Urwin and 1st team defender Grant Hanley also signed new contracts at the club.

On 7 June 2013 Operations Director Paul Agnew was fired by the club owners Venkys.

On 10 June 2013, Blackburn Rovers installed Terry McPhillips as assistant manager and Tony Grant as first-team coach, while Carlisle United youth team coach Eric Kinder re-joins Rovers as head of the youth team.

On 21 June 2013, Blackburn Rovers welcome back former player Craig Short who joins Gary Bowyer's backroom staff as first team coach.

On 3 July, Blackburn Rovers announced their new shirt sponsor as RFS (Regulatory Finance Solutions Ltd), a management consultancy business.

Pre-season friendlies

Championship
Blackburn's game against Derby County was a fixture released early to mark the special 125th anniversary of the Football League. Gary Bowyer's first game as manager would ironically be against a club he coached at previously before joining Rovers in 2005.

BBC Football

Team statistics

League table

Result by round

Overall summary

Summary

 Leon Best gained a booking from the bench.
 Most yellows & reds

Cup Competitions

League Cup
Rovers started their League Cup campaign earlier than usual against League One outfit Carlisle United, it was the first time Rovers appeared in the first round since 2000.

FA Cup

Club

Technical staff

Medical staff

Squad statistics

Appearances and goals

|-
|colspan="14"|Players out on loan:

|-
|colspan="14"|Players who have not played:

|-
|colspan="14"|Players that played for Blackburn Rovers this season that have left the club:

|}

Assists

Transfers

Summer

In

 Total spent  ~ Undisclosed (~ £1,600,000+)

Out

 Total sold  ~ Undisclosed (~ £3,600,000)

Loan in

Loan out

Youth Loan out

Winter

In

 Total spent  ~ undisclosed (est ~ £900,000)

Out

 Total sold  ~ undisclosed (est ~ £1,500,000+)

Loan in

Loan out

References

External links
Blackburn Rovers F.C. official website

2013-14
2013–14 Football League Championship by team